In mathematics, the moments of a function are certain quantitative measures related to the shape of the function's graph. If the function represents mass density, then the zeroth moment is the total mass, the first moment (normalized by total mass) is the center of mass, and the second moment is the moment of inertia. If the function is a probability distribution, then the first moment is the expected value, the second central moment is the variance, the third standardized moment is the skewness, and the fourth standardized moment is the kurtosis. The mathematical concept is closely related to the concept of moment in physics.

The same is not true on unbounded intervals (Hamburger moment problem).

In the mid-nineteenth century, Pafnuty Chebyshev became the first person to think systematically in terms of the moments of random variables.

Significance of the moments
The -th raw moment (i.e., moment about zero) of a distribution is defined bywhereThe -th moment of a real-valued continuous function f(x) of a real variable about a value c is the integralIt is possible to define moments for random variables in a more general fashion than moments for real-valued functions — see moments in metric spaces. The moment of a function, without further explanation, usually refers to the above expression with c = 0.
For the second and higher moments, the central moment (moments about the mean, with c being the mean) are usually used rather than the moments about zero, because they provide clearer information about the distribution's shape.

Other moments may also be defined.

The moments about its mean  are called central moments; these describe the shape of the function, independently of translation.

If f is a probability density function, then the value of the integral above is called the -th moment of the probability distribution.
Whenthe moment is said not to exist. If the -th moment about any point exists, so does the -th moment (and thus, all lower-order moments) about every point.
The zeroth moment of any probability density function is 1, since the area under any probability density function must be equal to one.

Standardized moments 

These normalised central moments are dimensionless quantities, which represent the distribution independently of any linear change of scale.

For an electric signal, the first moment is its DC level, and the second moment is proportional to its average power.

Notable moments

Mean

The first raw moment is the mean, usually denoted

Variance

The second central moment is the variance. The positive square root of the variance is the standard deviation

Skewness

The third central moment is the measure of the lopsidedness of the distribution; any symmetric distribution will have a third central moment, if defined, of zero. The normalised third central moment is called the skewness, often . A distribution that is skewed to the left (the tail of the distribution is longer on the left) will have a negative skewness. A distribution that is skewed to the right (the tail of the distribution is longer on the right), will have a positive skewness.

Kurtosis

The fourth central moment is a measure of the heaviness of the tail of the distribution. Since it is the expectation of a fourth power, the fourth central moment, where defined, is always nonnegative; and except for a point distribution, it is always strictly positive.

The kurtosis  is defined to be the standardized fourth central moment. (Equivalently, as in the next section, excess kurtosis is the fourth cumulant divided by the square of the second cumulant.) If a distribution has heavy tails, the kurtosis will be high (sometimes called leptokurtic); conversely, light-tailed distributions (for example, bounded distributions such as the uniform) have low kurtosis (sometimes called platykurtic).

The inequality can be proven by consideringwhere . This is the expectation of a square, so it is non-negative for all a; however it is also a quadratic polynomial in a. Its discriminant must be non-positive, which gives the required relationship.

Higher moments 
High-order moments are moments beyond 4th-order moments. 

As with variance, skewness, and kurtosis, these are higher-order statistics, involving non-linear combinations of the data, and can be used for description or estimation of further shape parameters. The higher the moment, the harder it is to estimate, in the sense that larger samples are required in order to obtain estimates of similar quality. This is due to the excess degrees of freedom consumed by the higher orders. Further, they can be subtle to interpret, often being most easily understood in terms of lower order moments – compare the higher-order derivatives of jerk and jounce in physics. For example, just as the 4th-order moment (kurtosis) can be interpreted as "relative importance of tails as compared to shoulders in contribution to dispersion" (for a given amount of dispersion, higher kurtosis corresponds to thicker tails, while lower kurtosis corresponds to broader shoulders), the 5th-order moment can be interpreted as measuring "relative importance of tails as compared to center (mode and shoulders) in contribution to skewness" (for a given amount of skewness, higher 5th moment corresponds to higher skewness in the tail portions and little skewness of mode, while lower 5th moment corresponds to more skewness in shoulders).

Mixed moments 
Mixed moments are moments involving multiple variables.

The value  is called the moment of order  (moments are also defined for non-integral ). The moments of the joint distribution of random variables  are defined similarly. The mixed moment  is called the covariance and is one of the basic characteristics of dependency between random variables.

Some examples are covariance, coskewness and cokurtosis.  While there is a unique covariance, there are multiple co-skewnesses and co-kurtoses.

Properties of moments

Transformation of center 
Since

where  is the binomial coefficient, it follows that the moments about b can be calculated from the moments about a by:

The moment of a convolution of function 

The moment of a convolution  reads 

where  denotes the -th moment of the function given in the brackets. This identity follows by the convolution theorem for moment generating function and applying the chain rule for differentiating a product.

Cumulants

The first raw moment and the second and third unnormalized central moments are additive in the sense that if X and Y are independent random variables then

(These can also hold for variables that satisfy weaker conditions than independence. The first always holds; if the second holds, the variables are called uncorrelated).

In fact, these are the first three cumulants and all cumulants share this additivity property.

Sample moments 
For all k, the -th raw moment of a population can be estimated using the -th raw sample  moment

applied to a sample  drawn from the population.

It can be shown that the expected value of the raw sample moment is equal to the -th raw moment of the population, if that moment exists, for any sample size . It is thus an unbiased estimator. This contrasts with the situation for central moments, whose computation uses up a degree of freedom by using the sample mean. So for example an unbiased estimate of the population variance (the second central moment) is given by

in which the previous denominator  has been replaced by the degrees of freedom , and in which  refers to the sample mean.

Problem of moments

Problems of determining a probability distribution from its sequence of moments are called problem of moments. Such problems were first discussed by P.L. Chebyshev (1874) in connection with research on limit theorems. In order that the probability distribution of a random variable  be uniquely defined by its moments  it is sufficient, for example, that Carleman's condition be satisfied:

A similar result even holds for moments of random vectors. The problem of moments seeks characterizations of sequences that are sequences of moments of some function f, all moments  of which are finite, and for each integer  let

where  is finite. Then there is a sequence  that weakly converges to a distribution function  having  as its moments.

Partial moments
Partial moments are sometimes referred to as "one-sided moments." The -th order lower and upper partial moments with respect to a reference point r may be expressed as

If the integral function do not converge, the partial moment does not exist.

Partial moments are normalized by being raised to the power 1/n. The upside potential ratio may be expressed as a ratio of a first-order upper partial moment to a normalized second-order lower partial moment. They have been used in the definition of some financial metrics, such as the Sortino ratio, as they focus purely on upside or downside.

Central moments in metric spaces
Let  be a metric space, and let B(M) be the Borel -algebra on M, the -algebra generated by the d-open subsets of M. (For technical reasons, it is also convenient to assume that M is a separable space with respect to the metric d.) Let .

The  -th central moment of a measure  on the measurable space (M, B(M)) about a given point  is defined to be

See also

 Energy (signal processing)
 Factorial moment
 Generalised mean
 Image moment
 L-moment
 Method of moments (probability theory)
 Method of moments (statistics)
 Moment-generating function
 Moment measure
 Second moment method
 Standardised moment
 Stieltjes moment problem
 Taylor expansions for the moments of functions of random variables

References 
  Text was copied from Moment at the Encyclopedia of Mathematics, which is released under a Creative Commons Attribution-Share Alike 3.0 (Unported) (CC-BY-SA 3.0) license and the GNU Free Documentation License.

Further reading

External links

Moments at Mathworld

 
Moment (physics)